Scrobipalpa maniaca is a moth in the family Gelechiidae. It was described by Povolný in 1969. It is found in China (Xinjiang), Afghanistan, Mongolia, Russia (Lower Volga region, Chitinskaya oblast), Turkmenistan and Uzbekistan.

Larvae have been recorded within galls of Stefaniola deformans.

References

Scrobipalpa
Moths described in 1969
Taxa named by Dalibor Povolný